Artur Vyacheslavovich Mikheev (born 24 May 1962), better known under his stage name Arthur Berkut (Russian: Артур Беркут), is a Russian singer. Throughout his career, he has participated in numerous bands, with the most notable being Autograph, Mavrik, and Aria.

Arthur was born in Kharkiv, Ukrainian Soviet Socialist Republic, to a family of Moscow circus troupers during their Ukrainian tour. Since 1984, Arthur has performed under his stage name, "Berkut", which is Russian for golden eagle. Together with Autograph, Berkut toured over the United States in 1989, but in 1990, during the tour, Autograph disbanded.

Berkut remained in the US and tried himself in different projects, formed a short-lived art rock band ZOOOM. In 1997, Arthur returned to Russia. He was a sessional vocalist in Master European tour, and together with some of Master musicians tried to resurrect ZOOOM. But a year after he dissolved the band and left to sing in Sergey Mavrin's solo project Mavrik. Arthur joined Aria in November 2002, replacing the band's former vocalist, Valery Kipelov.  In 2011, Arthur left Aria and formed a new band, Arthur Berkut, with whom he has recorded two albums so far.

References

External links
Official website
Profile on Aria official website
Aria's unofficial forum in 

1962 births
Living people
Aria (band) members
Russian heavy metal singers
20th-century Russian male singers
20th-century Russian singers
Musicians from Kharkiv
Russian rock singers
21st-century Russian male singers
21st-century Russian singers